"There You Go" is a song recorded by Canadian country music group Prescott-Brown. It was released in 1994 as the first single from their second studio album, Already Restless. It peaked at number 10 on the RPM Country Tracks chart in July 1994.

Chart performance

References

1994 songs
1994 singles
Prescott-Brown songs
Columbia Records singles
Songs written by Barry Brown (Canadian musician)
Song recordings produced by Paul Worley